Saperda perforata is a species of beetle in the family Cerambycidae. It was described by Pallas in 1773, originally under the genus Cerambyx. It has a wide distribution in Europe. It feeds on Populus nigra, Populus alba, and Populus tremula. It is preyed upon by the parasitoid wasp Xorides indicatorius.

Varietas
 Saperda perforata var. paliidipes Pic
 Saperda perforata var. albella Reitter
 Saperda perforata var. rudolfi Caderhjolm, 1798

References

perforata
Beetles described in 1773
Taxa named by Peter Simon Pallas